Junior Stars FC is a Martinois football club based in Sandy Ground. The club competes in the Saint-Martin Senior League, the top tier of Martinois football.

The club was founded in 1965, and play their home matches in the 2,600-capacity, Stade Alberic Richards.

Players and staff

Current roster

The current roster 2021/2022:

2022 Caribbean Club Shield

References

External links 
SMFA Profile
Official website

Junior Stars Fc
Association football clubs established in 1965
1965 establishments in the Collectivity of Saint Martin